Journal of Clinical Medicine is a medical journal that covers clinical and pre-clinical research. Topics of interest include cardiology, gastroenterology & hepatopancreatobiliary medicine, clinical neurology etc. The journal is published by MDPI.

Abstracting and indexing 
The journal is abstracted and indexed in:

 CAPlus / SciFinder
 CNKI
 DOAJ
 EBSCO
 Web of Science

According to the Journal Citation Reports, the journal has a 2021 impact factor of 4.964.

References

External links 

 
English-language journals
Publications with year of establishment missing

MDPI academic journals
Clinical practice journals